The Stratton Mountain School is a college preparatory high school located at Stratton Mountain in Stratton, Vermont. The school was founded in 1972 by Warren Hellman and Donald Tarinelli. The current headmaster is Carson Thurber.

Stratton Mountain School trains winter athletes with a focus on alpine skiing (including freeski and freestyle), snowboarding, and Nordic skiing. The school has produced 46 Olympic athletes who have won six medals (3 gold, 1 silver, and 2 bronze). Ross Powers ('97) won a bronze medal (snowboarding halfpipe) at the 1998 winter games held in Nagano, Japan, and a gold medal at the 2002 games held in Salt Lake City, Utah. Powers currently serves Director of the Snowboard program.

Other Olympic medalist alumni include Lindsey Jacobellis ('03), who won a silver medal in snowboard cross in Torino, Italy in 2006 and two gold medals in Beijing in 2022. Kristen Luckenbill ('97), won a gold medal in soccer at the 2004 Summer Games in Athens, Greece.

References

External links 
 

1972 establishments in Vermont
Educational institutions established in 1972
Private high schools in Vermont
Schools in Windham County, Vermont
Buildings and structures in Stratton, Vermont
Boarding schools in Vermont